Brian M. Salzberg is an American neuroscientist, biophysicist and professor. He is Professor of Neuroscience and of Physiology at the Perelman School of Medicine, University of Pennsylvania.

Salzberg's research has been focused in the area of Neuroscience and Biophysics. Together with Lawrence B. Cohen, Salzberg has contributed significantly to the optical imaging revolution since the 1970s, prior to which electrophysiology was limited to direct impalement of neurons in the brain with blind probes. He pioneered the application of optical methods that he developed with Cohen to problems in cell physiology and neuroscience.

Salzberg is also credited with the first recording of electrical activity and characterization of the ionic basis of the action potential in vertebrate nerve terminals, the description of rapid light scattering changes, and intrinsic fluorescence changes from mammalian nerve terminals and with Amiram Grinvald, the first intracellular staining with voltage sensitive dyes.

Salzberg is a Fellow of the American Association for the Advancement of Science, the American Physical Society, and the Optical Society of America.

Education and early training 
Salzberg received his B.S. (magna cum laude) from Yale College in 1963. In 1965, he received his A.M. and in 1972, his Ph.D., both from Harvard University. In 1971, he joined the Yale University, School of Medicine for Post Doctoral Research in Physiology. In 1972, he also joined the Marine Biological Laboratory, Wood Hole as an Investigator and continued working there in the summers until 1994.

In 1974, Salzberg received a National Research Council Travel Fellowship to attend the International Congress of Physiological Sciences in New Delhi. He received the STEPS Fellowship from the Marine Biological Laboratory for two years in 1977 and 1978.

Career 
Salzberg joined the University of Pennsylvania as assistant professor in 1975, becoming associate professor in 1980 and full professor in 1982. He is currently Professor of Neuroscience and of Physiology at the University of Pennsylvania.

In 1986, Salzberg was elected to the Council of the Society of General Physiologists and served there until 1988. He was elected to the Council and to the Executive Board of the Biophysical Society in 1987 and served there for three years. He was re-elected to the Council of Biophysical Society in 1998 and re-elected to the Executive Board for two years in 2000.

Salzberg was an Associate Editor of the Biophysical Journal from 2012 to 2019 and was appointed as an Associate Editor of Neurophotonics in 2013. He has served on the Editorial Boards of the Journal of General Physiology, and of Cellular and Molecular Neurobiology. He has also served on the Editorial Boards of Cell Biochemistry and Biophysics, Archives of Medical Science (Poland), ISRN Biophysics, and Frontiers in Neuroscience.

Research and work 
Together, Cohen and Salzberg have contributed significantly to the optical imaging revolution since the 1970s, prior to which electrophysiology was limited to direct impalement of neurons in the brain with electrodes. He pioneered the application of optical methods to problems in cell physiology and neuroscience that he developed with Cohen. He was a primary participant in all of the experiments that resulted in the discovery of the probes that enabled functional imaging. This was quickly followed by the first optical recording of action potentials from individual neurons, and then the first multiple site optical recording of membrane voltage. This achievement paved the way for much of the functional imaging of the nervous system that has followed.

Salzberg and Cohen implemented the first combined visualization of neuronal electrical activity with morphology. This approach afforded an unprecedented level of discourse between morphology and physiology, a crucial step in integrative neuroscience. Together with their colleagues, they also introduced imaging of specific intracellular ion changes. By using the calcium sensor Arsenazo III in squid axon, together with J.E. Brown and colleagues, they established what would be the first link between membrane potential and second messenger activation.

Other contributions include the first recording of electrical activity and the first characterization of the ionic basis of the action potential in mammalian nerve terminals and, together with Grinvald, the first intracellular staining with voltage-sensitive dyes. Salzberg also discovered and characterized the large fast changes in light scattering from mammalian nerve terminals that are related to secretion, and he also detected robust intrinsic fluorescence changes from nerve terminals.

Salzberg is also credited with Ana Lia Obaid for the first multiple-site optical recording with single cell resolution from a mammalian neural network. With Obaid and Thomas D. Parsons, he was the first to monitor effective connectivity patterns in ensembles of identified invertebrate neurons in culture in 1989.

Working with Stephan Rohr, Salzberg showed the dependence of impulse conduction on the geometry of the underlying excitable tissue using photolithographically patterned growth heart cell cultures. He also detected extremely rapid mechanical "spikes" in nerve terminals using high bandwidth atomic force microscopy and he reported the first two-photon recording of the action potential from individual mammalian terminals in situ.

He made the discovery of the first sensitive molecular probe of the membrane potential, with H. Vicencio Davila and Cohen, the first optical recording of action potentials from neurons and the first multiple site optical recording of membrane potential, the first optical recording of electrical activity from gland cells and, with Francisco Bezanilla, the optical measurement of the series resistance in squid giant axons.

He was also responsible for the first optical recording from cerebellar slices, the first measurement of extracellular K accumulation in the cerebellum (with Arthur Konnerth and Obaid), and the first optical recording of electrical activity in olfactory bulb dendrites with A. Cinelli. He was the first to monitor effective connectivity patterns in cultured ensembles of identified invertebrate neurons, and with M. Muschel, he made the first millisecond time resolved measurements of Ca dynamics in mammalian nerve terminals. Salzberg also introduced the use of high power LEDs as ultra-stable light sources for physiological measurements.

Athletics 
Salzberg is a long distance runner who completed 21 marathons between 1973 and 2007 including 7 Boston Marathons and 4 NYC Marathons. Between 1977 and 1992, he finished 7 marathons, never slower than 2:58:20 and mostly in the low 2:50's. He is one of the four men who have completed every Falmouth Road Race from its inception in 1973 with a PR of 40:40.

Awards and honors 
1981 - MBL AWARD for Best Scientific Paper, General Scientific Meetings, Marine Biological Laboratory, Woods Hole
1987 - Elected Fellow, American Association for the Advancement of Science. 
1987 - Elected Fellow, American Physical Society
1987 - Arturo Rosenblueth Visiting Professor, Centro de Investigacion y de Estudios Avanzados del IPN, Mexico City, Mexico
1987 - 1995 - Elected to the Board of Trustees, Marine Biological Laboratory, Woods Hole
1989 - Japan Society for the Promotion of Science Fellowship for Research in Japan
1991 - Guest Fellow of the Royal Society at University of Cambridge 
1995 - International Brain Research Organization Traveling Lecturer: Tata Institute, Bombay & Bangalore, India
2005 - National Fellow, The Explorer’s Club
2006 - 2009 - Elected to the Executive Council, Division of Biological Physics, American Physical Society
2014 - Elected Fellow, Optical Society of America

Selected publications

Books 
Optical methods in cell physiology (Society of General Physiologists series) (1986)

Selected articles 
Davila, H.V., B.M. Salzberg, L.B. Cohen, and A.S. Waggoner. A Large Change in Axon Fluorescence That Provides a Promising Method for Measuring Membrane Potential.  Nature, New Biol., 241, 159-160 (1973)
Salzberg, B.M., H.V. Davila, and L.B. Cohen. Optical Recording of Impulses in Individual Neurones of An Invertebrate Central Nervous System.  Nature, 246, 508-509. (1973)
Brown, J.E., L.B. Cohen, P. De Weer, L.H. Pinto, W.N. Ross, and B.M. Salzberg. Rapid Changes in Intracellular Free Calcium Concentration. Detection by metallochromic indicator dyes in squid giant axon.  Biophys. J., 15, 1155-1160 (1975)
Salzberg, B.M., A. Grinvald, L.B. Cohen, H.V. Davila, and W.N. Ross. Optical Recording of Neuronal Activity in an Invertebrate Central Nervous System: Simultaneous Monitoring of Several Neurons. J. Neurophysiology, 40, 1281-1291 (1977) 
Cohen, L.B. and B.M. Salzberg: Optical Measurement of Membrane Potential. Rev Physiol Biochem Pharmacol, 83, 35-88 (1978)
Salzberg, B.M., A.L. Obaid, D.M. Senseman, and H. Gainer. Optical Recording of Action Potentials from Vertebrate Nerve Terminals Using Potentiometric Probes Provides Evidence for Sodium and Calcium Components. Nature 306, 36 - 40 (1983)
Salzberg, B.M. and F. Bezanilla. An Optical Determination of the Series Resistance in Loligo. J. Gen. Physiol. 82, 807 - 818 (1983)
Salzberg, B.M. A.L. Obaid, and H. Gainer. Large and Rapid Changes in Light Scattering Accompany Secretion by Nerve Terminals in the Mammalian Neurohypophysis. J. Gen. Physiol. 86, 395 - 41 1 (1985)
Grinvald, A., B.M. Salzberg, V. Lev-Ram, and R. Hildesheim. Optical Recording of Synaptic Potentials from Processes of Single Neurons Following Iontophoretic Injection of Potentiometric Dyes. Biophys. J. 51,643-651 (1987)
Parsons, T.D., B.M. Salzberg, A.L. Obaid, F. Raccuia-Behling, and D. Kleinfeld. Long-Term Optical Recording of Patterns of Electrical Activity in Ensembles of Cultured Aplysia Neurons. J. Neurophysiol. 66, 316-333 (1991)
Rohr, S. and B.M. Salzberg. Characteization of Impulse Propagation at the Microscopic Level Across Geometrically Defined Expansions of Excitable Tissue: Multiple Site Optical Recording of Transmembrane Voltage (MSORTV) in Patterned Growth Heart Cell Cultures. J. Gen. Physiol. 104: 287 -309 (1994)
Obaid, A.L., T. Koyano, J. Lindstrom, T. Sakai, and B.M. Salzberg. Spatio-temporal Patterns of Activity in an Intact Mammalian Network with Single Cell Resolution: Optical Studies of Nicotinic Activity in an Enteric Plexus. J. Neuroscience 19:3073-3093 (1999)
Kosterin, P., G.-H. Kim, M. Muschol, A.L. Obaid, and B.M. Salzberg. Changes in FAD and NADH Fluorescence in Neurosecretory Terminals are Triggered by Calcium Entry and ADP Production. J. Membr. Biol. 208:113-124 (2005)
Kim GH, Kosterin P, Obaid AL, Salzberg BM. A Mechanical Spike Accompanies the Action Potential in Mammalian Nerve Terminals. Biophys J. 92(9):3122-9, (2007)
Fisher, J.A.N., J. R. Barchi, C. G. Welle, G.H. Kim, P. Kosterin, A.L. Obaid, A. Yodh, D. Contreras, and B.M. Salzberg. Two-photon Excitation of Potentiometric Probes Enables Optical Recording of Action Potentials from Mammalian Nerve Terminals In Situ. J. Neurophysiol. 99: 1545-1553 (2008)

References 

Year of birth missing (living people)
Living people
University of Pennsylvania faculty
American neuroscientists
Yale College alumni
Harvard University alumni
Fellows of the American Physical Society